Saint-Nicolas-d'Aliermont is a commune in the Seine-Maritime department in the Normandy region in north-western France.

Geography

Heraldry

Population

Places of interest
 The church of St. Nicolas, dating from the thirteenth century.
 The horology museum.

See also
Communes of the Seine-Maritime department

References

External links

Official website of the commune 

Communes of Seine-Maritime